When Naples Sings (Italian:Napoli che canta) is a 1926 Italian film directed by Roberto Roberti.

Cast
 Rodolfo De Angelis 
 Adolfo Della Monica 
 Tecla Scarano

References

Bibliography
 Giorgio Bertellini. Italy in Early American Cinema: Race, Landscape, and the Picturesque. Indiana University Press, 2010.

External links

1926 films
1920s Italian-language films
Films directed by Roberto Roberti
Italian silent short films
Films set in Naples
Italian black-and-white films